Berthenay is a commune in the Indre-et-Loire department in central France. Berthenay is bordered by the river Loire and is near the city of Tours.

Population

See also
Communes of the Indre-et-Loire department

References

Communes of Indre-et-Loire